Andrzej Pilipiuk (born 20 March 1974 in Warsaw), Polish humoristic science-fiction and fantasy author. He debuted in 1996 with short story "Hiena", which featured the first appearance of Jakub Wędrowycz, an alcoholic exorcist. Since that time, Pilipiuk has written several dozen other short stories about that character.

Nine times nominated to the Janusz A. Zajdel Award, won it in 2002 for his short story Kuzynki, which he expanded into a novel in 2003 and followed by sequels: Księżniczka in 2004 and Dziedziczki in 2005. The series describes the adventures of 3 women: a more-than-1000-year-old teenage vampire, a 300-year-old alchemist-szlachcianka, and her relative, a former Polish secret agent from CBŚ (Polish 'FBI'). A recurring character in the series alchemist Michał Sędziwój, and the universe is the same as the one of Wędrowycz (who makes appearances from time to time).

Plipiuk lives in Kraków.

Bibliography

Series of Jakub Wędrowycz 
 Chronicles of Jakub Wędrowycz, (Kroniki Jakuba Wędrowycza, 2001)
 Ivanov the Wizard, (Czarownik Iwanow, 2002)
 Ye Shall Take a Black Hen, (Weźmisz czarno kure..., 2002)
 Mystery of Jack the Reaper, (Zagadka Kuby Rozpruwacza, 2004)
 Hanging for everybody, (Wieszać każdy może, 2006)
 Homo moonshinicus, (Homo bimbrownikus, 2009)
 Poison, (Trucizna, November 2012)
 Conan the Distiller, (Konan destylator, 2016)

Series Womenfolk (Kuzynki) 
 Tome 1: Womenfolk (Kuzynki, 2003)
 Tome 2: Princess (Księżniczka, 2004)
 Tome 3: Heiress (Dziedziczki, 2005)

Series of Pan Samochodzik 
In 1999-2005 Andrzej Pilipiuk under a pseudonym "Tomasz Olszakowski" also released 19 tomes continuing adventures about Pan Samochodzik:

 Pan Samochodzik i... Arka Noego
 Pan Samochodzik i... rubinowa tiara
 Pan Samochodzik i... tajemnice warszawskich fortów
 Pan Samochodzik i... zaginiony pociąg
 Pan Samochodzik i... sekret alchemika Sędziwoja 
 Pan Samochodzik i... zaginione poselstwo
 Pan Samochodzik i... łup Roman Ungern von Sternberg|barona Ungerna
 Pan Samochodzik i... zagubione miasto
 Pan Samochodzik i... wynalazek Franciszek Rychnowski|inżyniera Rychnowskiego
 Pan Samochodzik i... potomek szwedzkiego admirała
 Pan Samochodzik i... ikona z Warszawy
 Pan Samochodzik i... Czarny Książę 
 Pan Samochodzik i... więzień Jasnej Góry
 Pan Samochodzik i... brązowy notes
 Pan Samochodzik i... Adam z Wągrowca
 Pan Samochodzik i... diable wiano
 Pan Samochodzik i... mumia egipska
 Pan Samochodzik i... Relikwiarz świętego Olafa
 Pan Samochodzik i... Zamek w Chęcinach

Series The Norwegian diary (Norweski dziennik) 
 Tome 1: Escape (Ucieczka, 2005)
 Tome 2: Foreign paths (Obce ścieżki, 2006)
 Tome 3: Northern Winds (Północne wiatry,  2007)

Series Deer`s eye (Oko Jelenia) 

  The Way to Nidaros (Droga do Nidaros, 2008)
 Silver Doe From Visby (Srebrna Łania z Visby, 2008)
 The Wooden Stronghold (Drewniana Twierdza, 2008)
 The Master of Wolves (Pan Wilków, 2009)
 Triumph of Fox Reinicke (Tryumf Lisa Reinicke, 2010)
 Armillary Sphere (Sfera armilarna, 2011)
 The Owl's Mirror (Sowie Zwierciadło)

Other 
 Azure Leprosy (Błękitny trąd, 2001)
 The greatest mystery of mankind (Największa tajemnica ludzkości, never released)
 2586 Steps (2586 kroków, 2005) Short stories
 Operation: Resurrection Day (Operacja Dzień Wskrzeszenia, 2006)
 Red Fever (Czerwona gorączka, 2007) Short stories
 The Tree Butcher (Rzeźnik drzew, 2009) Short stories
 The Vampire from M-3 (Wampir z M-3, 2011)

In preparation 
 Liberty Bell (Dzwon wolności, 2010) Short stories
 Deer's eye t. 7 Incinerated city (Miasto spopielone, 2011) has been canceled due to the story's closure in a previous book Armillary sphere

References

External links

Author's official site
Author's site on Valkiria.net
Fanclub site in Czech republic

1974 births
Living people
Polish fantasy writers
Polish science fiction writers